The Dile was an American automobile 
manufactured in Reading, Pennsylvania from 1914 until 1916.  
Marketed as "distinctively individual", it sold for $485.

References

Defunct motor vehicle manufacturers of the United States
Cars introduced in 1914
Companies based in Reading, Pennsylvania